Jacob Ewaniuk (born September 1, 2000) is a Canadian actor.

Biography 
Ewaniuk is the voice of Nick in the first two seasons of the television series The Cat in the Hat Knows a Lot About That!. He also has a recurring role in Arthur voicing Timmy Tibble and voiced Hockey Math Monitor in Monster Math Squad. He voiced Jasper in Super Why and Billy in The Adventures of Chuck and Friends, as well as Spotty Pig, Twin Pig 1 and Twin Pig 2, in Wibbly Pig, and one of the Wild Kratts Kids in Wild Kratts. He also voiced Connor/Catboy in the first season of PJ Masks and Spike in The Doozers.

Ewaniuk's first role was Young Murdoch in the television show Murdoch Mysteries, and landed a role in the premiere episode of Rookie Blue.

In 2011, at the 32nd Young Artist Awards, Ewaniuk was nominated for Best Performance in a TV Series for his role as a Guest Star in Rookie Blue and Best Performance in a Voice-Over Role in The Cat in the Hat Knows a Lot About That!.

In 2012, at the 33rd Young Artist Awards, Ewaniuk was again nominated for Best Performance in a Voice-Over Role in The Cat in the Hat Knows a Lot About That!.

He appeared in the films Servitude and Dead Before Dawn 3D.

In 2015, he provided the voice of Junior in Total Drama Presents: The Ridonculous Race.

His younger sister is Canadian child actress Sophia Ewaniuk.

Jacob is also one of the key characters in the Canadian web TV series Kid's Town where he plays Keith Lightfoot. He starred in 12 episodes that were made in 2013.

Filmography

Voice roles

Other activities 
Ewaniuk also competes in several karting series in North America. In 2011 he competed in the Rotax Pan American Challenge and the SPORTALITY TRAK Championship.

References

External links
 
 The Cat in the Hat Knows a Lot About That | TheSceneInTO 
 Zervitude Movie

2000 births
Canadian male child actors
Canadian male voice actors
Canadian people of Ukrainian descent
Living people
Place of birth missing (living people)